= Mohammed Charaf Eddine Ketita =

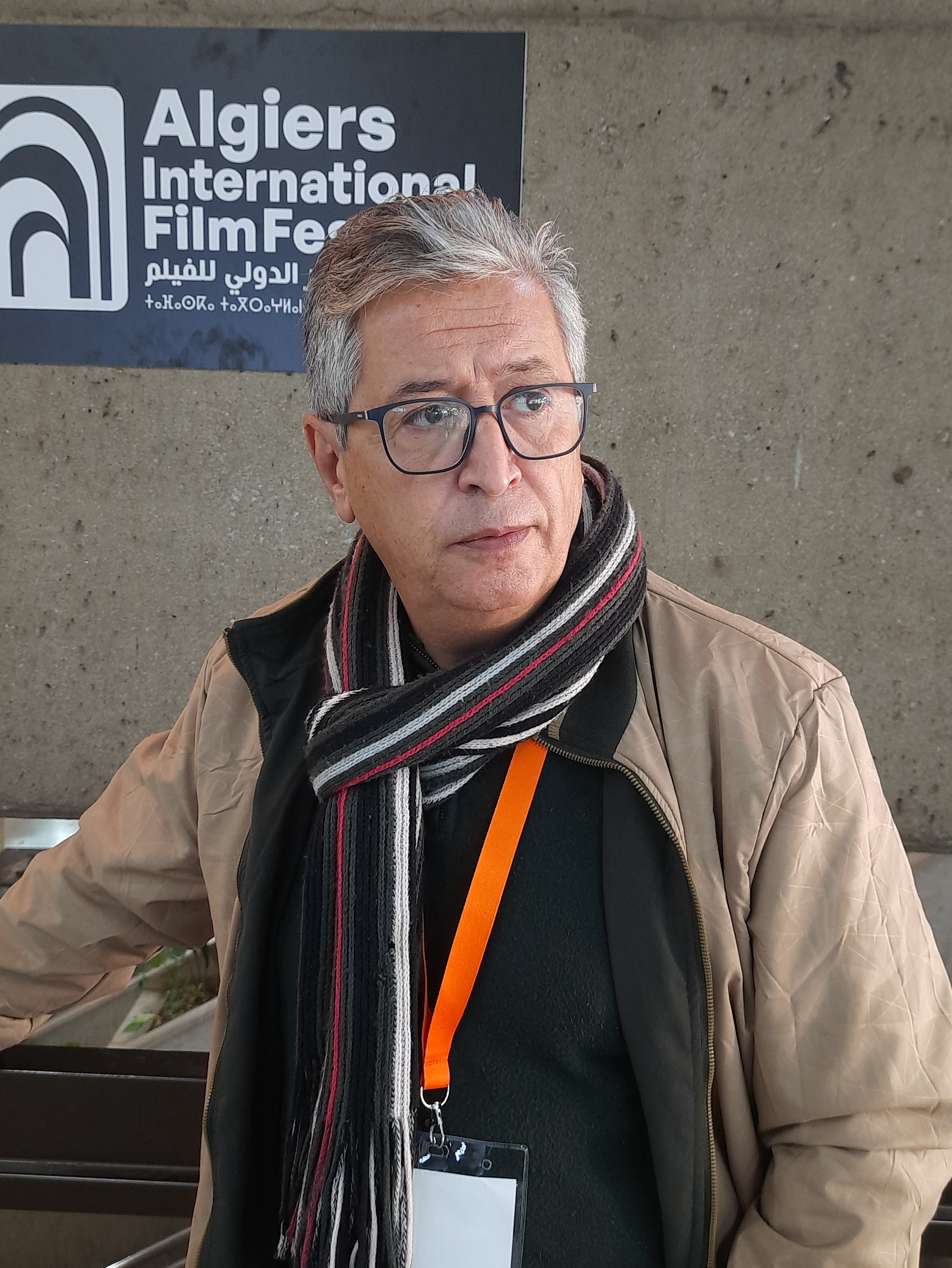
- Ketita Mohammed Charaf Eddine at AIFF
- Born: October 11, 1967; Oran, Algeria
- Education: Telecommunications (Algeria); filmmaking training in France
- Alma mater: École Supérieure des Réalisations Audiovisuales (ESRA); CLCF (Paris)
- Occupations: Film director, screenwriter, producer
- Years active: 1998–present
- Known for: Film and television directing

Mohammed Charaf Eddine Ketita (born October 11, 1967 in Oran, Algeria) is an Algerian director, screenwriter and producer.

== Biography ==
=== Education ===
Mohamed Charaf-Eddine Kettaita is a telecommunications graduate from Algeria, who then trained in filmmaking in France. He attended the École Supérieure des Réalisations Audiovisuales (ESRA) in Nice from 1989 to 1990, specializing in directing and earning a diploma as a first assistant director. He then trained at the CLCF (Conservatory of French Cinema) in Paris from 1990 to 1993, obtaining an advanced professional diploma in film techniques, specializing in assistant directing and editing. His diploma is recognized by the Federation of Cinema, Audiovisual and Multimedia Industries (FICAM), the High Commission for Image and Audiovisual Technology (CST), and the National Agency for Employment in Spectacles (ANSEA).

=== Professional beginnings ===
In 1998, he founded his production company, Cam Audio Visual, in Oran, where he produced numerous commercials, corporate films, advertising articles, and documentaries. Simultaneously, he worked as an independent director for several production companies, directing television series, comedy series, and television films for Algerian national television.

== Filmography ==
=== Director ===
==== Feature films ====
- 2025: Les Amants d'Alger, film de fiction, 135 min

Documentaries

- 2023: La Révolution d'El Keblouti et les Spahis (1871), documentaire-fiction, 52 min

==== TV movies ====
- 2016: The Last Mission, TV movie, 100 min
- 2012-2014: Scars
  - TV movies:
    - Houria the Nurse (52 min)
    - One Hero: The People (40 min)
    - The Virgin's Cliff (30 min)

==== Television ====
- 2012: Aftar baâda iftar, 35 épisodes, émission religieuse
- 2012: Dzairnaa, 20 épisodes, série historique
- 2012: Kahwa hlib, 10 épisodes, émission de divertissement
- 2010: Yawmiat Ezzarbote, sitcom, 15 épisodes
- 2005: Daha Kadi, série de fiction, 30 épisodes

==== Corporate and documentary films ====
- 2012: Aboubakr Belkaïd University of Tlemcen
- 2009: Crafts in Biskra
- 2008: Oran, Crossroads of Civilizations

=== Assistant director ===
- 2016: El Hanachia, feature film by Boualem Aissaoui
- 2015: The Intruders, feature film by Mohamed Fodil Hazourli
- 2013: And Us, TV movie
- 2012: Holm En-Noussour, docudrama
- 2010: We Will Not Die, short film
- 2007: Ali… and Ali, TV movie
